The list of ship decommissionings in 2014 includes a chronological list of ships decommissioned in 2014.

References

2014
 
Ships